Alhaji Abubakarr Jalloh is a Sierra Leonean politician. Since the election of Ernest Bai Koroma as President of Sierra Leone in September 2007, Jalloh has served as Minister of Mineral Resources. In 2002 Presidential election, Jalloh was the running mate of Koroma in the All People's Congress Party. He is a member of the Fula ethnic group.

Education
Jalloh attended the Methodist Boys’ High School in Freetown and then completed his A levels at Prince of Wales School. Jalloh then attended Fourah Bay College where he majored in math and physics. At Fourah Bay, Jalloh became involved in Maoist student protests. Jalloh later earned master's degrees in geophysics, atmospheric physics and hydrogeology from Imperial College London and University College London respectively.

External links
 Profile of Alhaji Abubakarr Jalloh The Patriotic Vanguard, 11 October 2007

Year of birth missing (living people)
Living people
Fourah Bay College alumni
Alumni of Imperial College London
Alumni of University College London
Sierra Leone People's Party politicians
Government ministers of Sierra Leone
Sierra Leonean Fula people